Chickasawhay Creek is a stream in the U.S. state of Mississippi. It is a tributary to Okatibbee Creek.

Chickasawhay is a name derived from the Choctaw language meaning "Chickasaw potato". Variant names are "Bogue Chitto Creek", "Chicasawhay Creek", "Chickasahay Creek", and "Chickasawhey Creek".

References

Rivers of Mississippi
Rivers of Lauderdale County, Mississippi
Rivers of Kemper County, Mississippi
Mississippi placenames of Native American origin